Cinderella is a 2012 Russian romantic comedy film directed by Anton Bormatov. The picture is a modernized version of the Charles Perrault tale.

Plot
Masha Krapivina (Kristina Asmus) comes to Moscow from Lipetsk. She studies at an institute and works as a maid for a rich family, where she has to please the mean-spirited mistress Lyudmila (Margarita Bychkova) and her two daughters: Polina (Elizaveta Boyarskaya) and Ksenia (Anna Sherling).

Meanwhile, the maid has a crush on the famous singer Alexis Korolevich (Artyom Tkachenko). Learning that the host family is going to a private party with his participation, Masha is ready to do anything to see her idol. Her aunt Agniya Bordo (Nonna Grishayeva), editor-in-chief of "Yellow PRESS", comes to her aid. She is ready to give her an invitation, but only with the condition that she fulfills a journalistic task.

Cast
Kristina Asmus - Masha Krapivina "Cinderella"
Nikita Yefremov - Pasha, art director of the night club
Artyom Tkachenko - Alexis Korolevich
Nonna Grishayeva - Fairy / Agnia Bordo
Margarita Isaykova - girl
Yury Stoyanov - Viktor Pavlovich Chugainov, oil magnate
Elizaveta Boyarskaya - sister Polina
Anna Sherling - sister Ksenia
Sergey Burunov - producer Boris Markovich
Margarita Bychkova - stepmother Lyudmila, owner of the garbage business
Vitaly Grebennikov - Yakov
Alexander Tsekalo - husband of Agnia
Semyon Strugachev - Mikhail Levitsky

References

External links

Films based on Charles Perrault's Cinderella
Russian romantic comedy films
2012 romantic comedy films
2012 films
2010s Russian-language films